The 2017 FIA Formula One World Championship was the 71st season of Formula One motor racing. It featured the 68th Formula One World Championship, a motor racing championship for Formula One cars which is recognised by the sport's governing body, the Fédération Internationale de l'Automobile (FIA), as the highest class of  competition for open-wheel racing cars. Teams and drivers competed in twenty Grands Prix—starting in Australia on 26 March and ending in Abu Dhabi on 26 November—for the World Drivers' and World Constructors' championships.

The reigning Drivers' Champion Nico Rosberg was originally due to drive for Mercedes in 2017. He announced his retirement from the sport in December 2016 after winning his first drivers' World Championship, so the 2017 season was the first since  in which the reigning champion did not compete. Mercedes started the season as the defending Constructors' Champion, having secured their third consecutive title at the 2016 Japanese Grand Prix.

2017 was the first genuine inter-team title battle for five years. Lewis Hamilton and Mercedes had to contend with a resurgent Ferrari team with lead driver Sebastian Vettel heading the championship for the first 12 rounds and challenging deep into the twenty race season. At the conclusion of the championship, Hamilton won his fourth World Drivers' Championship title. Hamilton finished 46 points ahead of Sebastian Vettel in second with 317 points and Valtteri Bottas in third with 305 points. In the World Constructors' Championship, Mercedes won their fourth consecutive title at the 2017 United States Grand Prix and finished with 668 points. Ferrari finished second with 522 points and Red Bull Racing were third with 368 points.

Teams and drivers
The following teams and drivers took part in the 2017 Formula One World Championship. All teams competed with tyres supplied by Pirelli.

Free practice drivers 
Six drivers drove as free practice drivers over the course of the season.

Team changes
 Just Racing, the parent company of MRT, went into administration in January 2017. The company collapsed later that same month, ultimately closing down entirely in March after administrators were unable to find a buyer for MRT.
 Sauber used one year-old Ferrari power units in 2017, mirroring the arrangement between Ferrari and Scuderia Toro Rosso in 2016.

Driver changes

 Kevin Magnussen turned down an offer to stay with Renault and instead signed a deal with Haas to drive alongside Romain Grosjean. As a result of the agreement with Magnussen and the team's decision to take up an option on Grosjean, Esteban Gutiérrez's contract with the team was not renewed. Gutiérrez later moved to the Formula E championship.
 Esteban Ocon moved from MRT to Force India, filling the seat left vacant by Nico Hülkenberg's departure to Renault.
 Reigning champion and Mercedes driver Nico Rosberg announced his shock retirement from the sport at the end of the 2016 season, ending his Formula One career after 11 seasons when he clinched the title in Abu Dhabi. Valtteri Bottas was released by Williams to sign with Mercedes as Rosberg's replacement. Felipe Massa, who had intended to retire from Formula One at the end of the 2016 season, extended his contract with Williams by a year to replace his former teammate. Massa was partnered by 2016 European Formula 3 Championship winner Lance Stroll, who was originally hired by the team to replace Massa.
 2015 GP2 Series champion Stoffel Vandoorne joined McLaren as a full-time driver. Vandoorne previously competed in one race for the team, substituting for the injured Fernando Alonso at the 2016 Bahrain Grand Prix. Vandoorne replaced Jenson Button, who took a sabbatical from racing in 2017 while staying on with the team as a reserve driver.
 Pascal Wehrlein moved from the now-defunct MRT to replace Felipe Nasr at Sauber.
 Rio Haryanto was under contract to compete on 2017, but his contract was terminated after the 2016 German Grand Prix due to sponsorship issues.

Mid-season changes
 Sauber driver Pascal Wehrlein withdrew from the Australian Grand Prix as a precaution after an injury at the Race of Champions interrupted his training regime, prompting concerns that he would not be able to cope with the greater physical demands placed on the drivers by the 2017 generation of cars. As such, 2016 GP2 Series runner-up Antonio Giovinazzi took over racing duties for Sauber. Wehrlein returned to competition at the Bahrain Grand Prix, with Giovinazzi resuming testing and reserve driving duties.
 Fernando Alonso did not contest the Monaco Grand Prix. Instead, he participated in the Indianapolis 500. Jenson Button, who was serving as team ambassador and reserve driver, replaced Alonso for the race.
 Paul di Resta replaced Felipe Massa for the Hungarian Grand Prix after Massa was taken ill after Free Practice.
 Jolyon Palmer was dropped by Renault after the Japanese Grand Prix. Carlos Sainz Jr., who was set to join Renault from 2018, left Toro Rosso early to replace him.
 In the final rounds of the championship, Toro Rosso rotated several drivers between their cars. Prior to the Malaysian Grand Prix, Daniil Kvyat was replaced by 2016 GP2 Series champion Pierre Gasly. After Sainz Jr. left the team for Renault, Kvyat returned as his replacement for the United States Grand Prix. Gasly was forced to miss this race as it clashed with the final round of his Super Formula Championship campaign. FIA World Endurance Championship driver and former Red Bull Junior Team member Brendon Hartley stood in for him. After the race, Kvyat was released from the team and from the Red Bull programme entirely, with Gasly returning to the team at the next race and Hartley being promoted to a regular race seat.

Season calendar

The following twenty Grands Prix took place in 2017:

Calendar changes
 The Baku event was renamed, becoming the first Azerbaijan Grand Prix. The previous race at the Baku City Circuit ran under the European Grand Prix title in 2016. The date of the race was changed to avoid conflicting with the 24 Hours of Le Mans, which had been a source of controversy at the 2016 European Grand Prix.
 The Chinese and Bahrain Grands Prix swapped places in the schedule for the 2017 season.  The Chinese Grand Prix became the second round of the 2017 season and was scheduled to take place on 9 April.  This marked the earliest start ever in the Chinese Grand Prix history.
 The German Grand Prix was removed from the calendar in March after the owners of the Nürburgring pulled out of the event-sharing arrangement with the Hockenheimring to alternate between the two circuits. The owners of the Hockenheimring circuit were unwilling  to organise a Grand Prix every year due to financial problems and were unable to agree to commercial terms with Formula One Management.

Changes

General changes
 In September 2016, Liberty Media purchased a minority stake in the sport from CVC Capital Partners, and completed the purchase ahead of the 2017 season, with the long-term goal of adopting a model similar to that used by the U.S. National Football League and Major League Baseball, with teams entitled to purchase a stake in the sport. The commercial operation of the sport underwent a restructuring in January 2017, with Bernie Ecclestone leaving his position as chief executive of Formula One Group after forty years in the role. Former team principal Ross Brawn—who won World Championships with Ferrari and his own eponymous team—was appointed as managing director in Ecclestone's stead.
 With the acquisition of the sport by Liberty Media, teams were given more control over creating and uploading content to social media. Under Bernie Ecclestone's previous management, all footage filmed in the paddock was automatically controlled by Formula One Management with tight restrictions on the release of content.

Technical regulations

 The technical regulations governing bodywork design were revised for 2017, with the objective of improving lap times by four to five seconds over the 2016 generation of cars. These changes include:
 The leading edge of the barge boards was brought forward to allow teams more freedom in controlling airflow.
 Tyre width increased by 25% to allow cars to generate more mechanical grip.
 2017 saw teams adopt the "T-wing", a thin T-shaped wing mounted to the bodywork above and forward of the rear wing to generate additional downforce. Its creation prompted concerns about the use of moveable aerodynamic devices—forbidden under the rules—after several T-wings were observed to be vibrating during pre-season testing. However, the stewards chose to review the use of T-wings on a case-by-case basis rather than issue a technical directive. The usage of T-wings, along with Shark fins would later be banned in the following season.
 The token system used to regulate power unit development—where the power unit was divided into individual areas, and each area assigned a points value with development of these areas deducting points from a manufacturer's overall points quota—will be abandoned.
 Restrictions are to be placed on the dimensions, weight and the materials used to build each individual component of the power unit.
 Teams are restricted to four power units per season regardless of the number of Grands Prix in the season. Previous seasons had included a provision for a fifth power unit if the number of Grands Prix in a season exceeded twenty; from 2017, this provision is to be abandoned.
 The cost of a power unit supply is reduced by €1 million in 2017 ahead of a further reduction in 2018.
 Cameras are no longer permitted to be mounted on stalks located on the nose of the car.
 Pirelli continued to be Formula One's sole tyre partner and supplier in 2017, beating out a bid by Michelin to provide tyres for the championship. Continuing from previous seasons, the company offered a range of seven different tyre compounds, five for dry and two for wet conditions. While both wet compounds are available for every Grand Prix, only a choice of three dry compounds are made available to teams for a single race weekend. As in the previous season, teams are allowed to choose ten out of thirteen sets of tyres for a race weekend freely from the three compounds made available by Pirelli. However, due to limited testing time for the new compounds during the winter break, Pirelli chose to provide teams with a mandatory number of sets for the first five races.

Sporting regulations
 Under rules introduced in 2015, grid penalties for exceeding a driver's quota of power unit components carried over from one race to the next if the penalty could not be fully served when issued. When this carry-over system was abandoned, teams could build up a reserve of spare components by introducing several at once while only serving a single grid penalty. From 2017, teams will only be able to use one new component over their quota per race, with any additional components incurring further penalties. This change prevents teams from "stockpiling" spare power unit components.
 Power unit suppliers will have an "obligation to supply", mandating that they supply power units to any team, should a team end up without an agreement. The rule was introduced following the breakdown in the relationship between Renault and their customer teams Red Bull Racing and Scuderia Toro Rosso at the end of the 2015 season that left both teams in limbo until deals could be arranged.
 In the event that a race is declared wet and must start behind the safety car, the grid will follow normal starting procedures once conditions are declared satisfactory for racing. Drivers will line up on the grid for a standing start once the safety car pulls into pit lane, although any laps completed behind the safety car will still count towards the total race distance.
 The FIA abandoned the rule governing driving standards under braking, in lieu of an all-encompassing rule against manoeuvres that could endanger other drivers. The rule was introduced in 2016 amid criticism of Max Verstappen for his habit of changing direction before braking late to defend his position, which led to concerns that such aggressive defensive driving could trigger an accident.
 Starting from the Spanish Grand Prix, teams were required to display a driver's name and racing number on the external bodywork of the car in such a way that they are clearly visible to spectators. Teams have the option to use the official timing screen abbreviation; for example HAM (Hamilton) and VET (Vettel).

Season report

The start of the season was tight between the title contenders, with various analysts describing the Ferrari SF70H as initially the more consistent car in race trim. Sebastian Vettel led the championship for the first 12 rounds (more than half the season) but never by more than 25 points. Vettel's loss of self‑control when he chose to barge Hamilton in Baku was the most incendiary incident between the pair, in a season in which there was a friendly mutual respect. However, Ferrari's challenge faltered towards the end of the season, with setbacks in Singapore and Malaysia (on tracks at which they were favoured to win), costing them vital points in both championships. Lewis Hamilton took the title at the Mexican Grand Prix with 2 races still to go. Hamilton was looking to regain the World Championship and his fourth overall while Vettel was looking to capture his first since 2013.

Results and standings

Grands Prix

Scoring system

Points were awarded to the top ten classified finishers in every race, using the following structure:

In order for full points to be awarded, the race winner must completed at least 75% of the scheduled race distance. Half points were awarded if the race winner completes less than 75% of the race distance provided that at least two laps are completed. In the event of a tie at the conclusion of the championship, a count-back system was used as a tie-breaker, with a driver's best result used to decide the standings.

World Drivers' Championship standings

Notes:
  – Drivers did not finish the Grand Prix, but were classified as they completed more than 90% of the race distance.

World Constructors' Championship standings

Notes:
  – Drivers did not finish the Grand Prix, but were classified as they completed more than 90% of the race distance.
 The standings are sorted by best result, rows are not related to the drivers. In case of tie on points, the best positions achieved determined the outcome.

Notes

References

External links

 

 
Formula One seasons
Formula 1